Emurena quinquepunctata is a moth of the family Erebidae first described by Max Gaede in 1928. It is found in Colombia.

References

Phaegopterina
Moths described in 1928